Apollo Eleven was a New Zealand thoroughbred racehorse.

Background
Apollo Eleven was foaled in 1967 by Cyrus out of Lady Rizzio.

Racing career

He is notable for winning the following races:

 the 1973 Tancred Stakes. 
 the 1973 Auckland Cup. 
 the 1973 Chipping Norton Stakes. 
 the 1973 Queen Elizabeth Stakes
 the 1973 Sydney Cup.
 the 1975 Chipping Norton Stakes.

Apollo Eleven held the distinction for the fastest recorded time in 3 minutes and 19 seconds, equalled by Just A Dancer in 1991. 

He returned to Sydney in 1975 to win the Chipping Norton Stakes but was suspected of being poisoned when travelling to the racecourse to compete for the Sydney Cup in 1975 by Sydney-based crime syndicates.

Pedigree

References

 Apollo Eleven's pedigree

1967 racehorse births
Thoroughbred family 16-c
Racehorses bred in New Zealand
Racehorses trained in New Zealand
Auckland Cup winners
Sydney Cup winners